Kevin Hanchard (born July 4, 1974) is a Canadian actor, best known for his roles as Det. Arthur Bell in Orphan Black and Inspector Sematimba in The Expanse. Hanchard currently appears as Superintendent Joseph Donovan in Hudson and Rex.
 
On stage, Hanchard is known primarily for his performances at the Stratford Festival and the Shaw Festival, including productions of Fuenteovejuna, Macbeth, Julius Caesar, A Midsummer Night's Dream, Topdog/Underdog, The Millionairess and His Girl Friday. He is a two-time nominee for the Dora Mavor Moore Award for Outstanding Performance by a Male in a Principal Role – Play, in 2009 for Miss Julie: Freedom Summer and in 2011 for Topdog / Underdog as well as was a shortlisted nominee in the Best Supporting Actor in a Drama Series category for Orphan Black at the 2nd Canadian Screen Awards.

Filmography

Film

Television

Video games

References

External links

Canadian male television actors
Canadian male film actors
Canadian male stage actors
Canadian male voice actors
Black Canadian male actors
Living people
21st-century Canadian male actors
Canadian people of Jamaican descent
Canadian male Shakespearean actors
Best Supporting Actor in a Drama Series Canadian Screen Award winners
1974 births